La Bolefuego or Candileja is a legendary character from Colombian and Venezuelan folklore. It is said to be a bright apparition, found in the dark nights of Los Llanos. It is described as a flashing lantern that turns and shakes violently.

The legend 

The Bolefuego is said to be the spirit of a woman that was burned alive in her home, along with her two children. She attacks travelers. Those facing her are advised not to pray; unlike other evil entities, the Bolefuego is attracted by prayers.

See also 

 Will-o'-the-wisp
 Hitodama

References

Sources 
 

Latin American folklore
Myths and legends of Colombia
Venezuelan folklore
Spanish-language South American legendary creatures
Colombian folklore
South American ghosts
Atmospheric ghost lights
Female legendary creatures